The NASCAR AutoZone Elite Division, Northwest Series  was a regional NASCAR late model stock car racing series first codified in 1985. The series, along with its three other series in its division, folded in 2006. Unlike the NASCAR national series,  drivers competed in light-weight late model race cars. The series sanctioned races in Washington, Idaho, Oregon, Montana and a few races in Canada.

List of champions
The following drivers won the Northwest Series championship between the series' creation in 1985 and its termination in 2006.

References

External links
NASCAR Northwest Series archive at Racing-Reference

NASCAR series
Stock car racing series in the United States
Sports in the Western United States